Llandrinio is a small village and community in Montgomeryshire, Powys, Wales, close to the Wales-England border. It is situated on the B4393 road which travels from the village of Ford, Shropshire to Lake Vyrnwy. The community, Llandrinio and Arddleen includes Arddlin and a small part of Four Crosses, Powys.

Llandrinio community is home to 1,485 people (2011 census).

The mainly Norman church of St Trunio is a Grade II* listed building.

The village has a village hall and a playing field, which is used by the local cricket team and the junior football teams. The annual carnival has been opened by well-known faces such as actor Ryan Thomas. The River Severn and Offa's Dyke both run through the village. The river is crossed by Llandrinio Bridge which leads to the hamlet of Crew Green, about a mile east of the village and close to English border. The village is also road linked to the towns of Welshpool, Oswestry, Newtown and Shrewsbury.

Governance
An electoral ward in the same name exists. This ward had a population of 2,191 at the 2011 Census.

References

External links

 Village Community Website

Villages in Powys
Populated places on the River Severn
Communities in Powys